Proposition 2 may refer to:

2005 Texas Proposition 2
2006 Idaho Proposition 2
2008 California Proposition 2
2018 Idaho Proposition 2